The 2022 South Carolina State Bulldogs football team represented South Carolina State University as a member of the Mid-Eastern Athletic Conference (MEAC) during the 2022 NCAA Division I FCS football season. The Bulldogs, led by 21st-year head coach Oliver Pough, played their home games at Oliver C. Dawson Stadium.

Previous season

The Bulldogs finished the 2021 season with a record of 7–5, 5–0 MEAC play to win the MEAC regular season championship. The Bulldogs clinched a berth in the Celebration Bowl. The Bulldogs upset SWAC champions and 15th-ranked Jackson State 31-10 in the Celebration Bowl, their first postseason win since the December 1994 Heritage Bowl.

Schedule

Game summaries

at UCF

at Bethune–Cookman

at North Carolina A&T

at South Carolina

Florida A&M

Virginia–Lynchburg

North Carolina Central

at Morgan State

Delaware State

at Howard

Norfolk State

Notes and references

South Carolina State
South Carolina State Bulldogs football seasons
South Carolina State Bulldogs football